Lucien Scheler (1902 – 23 April 1999) was a French author, poet, publisher, and bookseller who participated in the literary resistance against Nazism.

Biography 
Scheler was born in Kassel, Germany in 1902. He was the grandson of philologist Auguste Scheler. During World War II, Scheler lived on Rue de Tournon in Paris, and worked as a bookseller and as an expert in ancient books. He then published Bibliographie de France, which contained works produced by French Resistance writers. From October 1942 to August 1944, at the request of Monny de Boully, he sheltered Paul Éluard and Nusch Éluard, two French artists who were under investigation by the police for being part of the French Resistance.

At his bookstore, Scheler forged counterfeit documents to help members of the French Resistance. Due to the resistance efforts of Paul Éluard, Scheler's bookstore became a rallying point for the messengers of the Éditions de Minuit. Lucien Scheler signed the poems he entrusted in 1943 to Paul Éluard and Jean Lescure for  under the pseudonyms of Jean Silence and Jean-Paul Mazurier. In 1944, the first issues of L'eternelle revue (an illegal magazine created by Paul Éluard with the help of Jean Lescure and Louis Parrot) were published in Scheler's bookshop, which first became available in June of that year. Along with being the author of several collections of poems, Scheler devoted himself to publishing the complete works of Jules Vallès in fifteen volumes, as well as those of Paul Éluard in two volumes, for the Bibliothèque de la Pléiade.

In December 2000, researchers searched through Scheler's publications to discover which ones were original. The list they came up with included Les Amies by Paul Delvaux, Les chevaux (1944) by Dubuffet, Paul Éluard (1952) by Valentine Hugo, Landscape of Ridgefield. New Jersey (1913) by Man Ray, as well as two paintings by Henri Michaux.

Bibliography

Poems 
1929: Évasions et Métamorphoses ou Robert Macaire dévoilé, Paris, Au vice impuni
1946: La Lampe tempête, with five drawings by Raoul Ubac, Paris, Éditions de Minuit
1958: Sillage intangible, with a dry point of Picasso, Paris, Le Degré 41
1963: Lisières du devenir, with six engravings on copper by Raoul Ubac, Paris, Jean Hugues
1973: Rémanences, Paris, E.F.R.
1977: Trois dont Calendarium, with four aquatints by Michel Richard, Les Arcs, Élisabeth Richard
1978: De Desiderio Patriae, with two etchings by Jean Cortot, Paris, Blaizot
1987: À nul autre que toi, with one lithograph by Jean Bazaine, Geneva, Jacques Quentin

Scholarly works 
1957–1960: Lavoisier et la Révolution française, Paris, Éditions Hermann
1960: Le Comité central des vingt arrondissements de Paris d'après les papiers inédits de Constant Martin et les sources imprimées, in collaboration with Jean Dautry, Paris, Éditions sociales
1964: Lavoisier et le principe chimique, Paris, Pierre Seghers

Sources 
1982: Lucien Scheler, La Grande Espérance des poètes, 1940-1945, Paris, Temps actuels, 388 p. 
1985: Gerhard Landes, « L'Honneur des poètes », « Europe », Geschichte und gedichte, Zur Lyrik der Résistance, Focus Verlarg, Giessen, 162 p. [Interview with Jean Lescure, text in French, p. 135-148]. 
1995: François Lachenal, Éditions des Trois Collines, Genève-Paris, IMEC Éditions, Paris, 168 p. 
1988: Jean Lescure, Poésie et Liberté, Histoire de Messages, 1939-1946, Éditions de l’IMEC, Paris, 472 p. .
2004: Archives des années noires. Artistes, écrivains et éditeurs, documents collected and présented by Claire Paulhan and Olivier Corpet, preface by Jérôme Prieur, Institut Mémoires de l'édition contemporaine, Paris, 144 p. 
2008: Les Lettres françaises and Les Étoiles dans la clandestinité, 1942-1944, presented by François Eychart and Georges Aillaud, Paris, 284 p. 
2009: Robert O. Paxton, Olivier Corpet and Claire Paulhan, Archives de la vie littéraire sous l'Occupation, À travers le désastre, Éditions Taillandier et les Éditions de l'IMEC, 448 p.  (p. 233, 276 and 299)

References 

 

20th-century French poets
French male poets
French art critics
French publishers (people)
French Resistance members
Writers from Kassel
1902 births
1999 deaths
20th-century French male writers
French male non-fiction writers